Emil Lohbeck (15 September 1905 – 29 July 1944) was a German basketball player. He competed in the men's tournament at the 1936 Summer Olympics. He was killed in action during World War II.

Lohbeck was a career soldier. He played basketball with Heeressportschule Wandorf. They won some sort of unofficial championship in 1938. The team he played with in the Olympics lost every game they were in.

References

External links
 

1905 births
1944 deaths
German men's basketball players
Olympic basketball players of Germany
Basketball players at the 1936 Summer Olympics
People from Sprockhövel
Sportspeople from Arnsberg (region)
German military personnel killed in World War II